Momenabad (also Romanized as Mo’menābād) is a village in Karizan Rural District, Nasrabad District, Torbat-e Jam County, Razavi Khorasan Province, Iran. At the 2006 census, its population was 2,165, in 505 families.

References 

Populated places in Torbat-e Jam County